Hyboloma is a monotypic snout moth genus described by Émile Louis Ragonot in 1891. Its only species, Hyboloma nummosalis, described in the same article, is found on Borneo.

References

Pyralinae
Monotypic moth genera
Moths of Asia
Pyralidae genera
Taxa named by Émile Louis Ragonot